Constance Mary Lewcock OBE born Constance Mary Ellis (11 April 1894 – 11 November 1980) was a British suffragette, arsonist and socialist.

Life
Lewcock was born in Horncastle in 1894.

In 1913 she volunteered her services to the Women's Social and Political Union and was initially warning against getting arrested. She learnt about politics by chairing and talking at WSPU meetings across County Durham.

She tried to set alight a pier of Durham Cathedral but failed. She later committed what she called the "perfect crime". In 1914 she burnt down a railway building at Esh Winning. She had designed a system where a jar of flammable liquid was set alight when a candle burnt down. This meant that by the time the wooden building was alight she was miles away establishing an alibi. She was also lucky to have the assistance of a miner named Joss Craddock. They had met and they had worked together at meetings where he could hold back the stewards whilst she made her point. This meant that Lewcock avoided the bruises she used to get before they met.

The railway building at Esh Winning burnt down but the Police could not make formal charges as she had over thirty witnesses who could testify that she was with them at the time of the fire. However her employers did not need proof and she was told that she must stop her political actions or give up teaching. She gave up teaching, but this was just as suffragette activity disappeared. That year the WSPU agreed a truce with the government for the period of the war. Lewcock increased her activities for the Independent Labour Party.

From 1960 she represented the Benwell ward on Newcastle city council. She was appointed an OBE in the New Years Honours List in 1966 and she ceased being a councillor in 1971.

In 1978 she was asked to come to Westminster Hall where leading politicians were leading celebrations of the suffragists achievements as it was fifty years since all women had the right to vote.

Lewcock died in Newcastle upon Tyne in 1980.

References

1894 births
1980 deaths
People from Horncastle, Lincolnshire
British suffragists